Arrangiatevi!, internationally released as You're on Your Own, is a 1959 Italian comedy film directed by Mauro Bolognini.

In 2008 the film was selected to enter the list of the 100 Italian films to be saved.

Plot summary
Peppino and his family move into a "brothel", i.e. an apartment inhabited by a group of prostitutes in the ancient streets of Rome. One of the girls mysteriously died, and so the house was bought by the family just in time for Peppino, who is forced to share with another family. Because of the gossips of the city and the neighborhood, in a short time Peppino's family falls into disgrace. Peppino, not knowing what to do as a father, comes to discover that his daughter has serious problems with her boyfriend.

Cast
Peppino De Filippo: Peppino Armentano
Totò: Grandpa Illuminato
Laura Adani:  Maria Armentano
Cristina Gaioni:  Maria Berta Armentano
Cathia Caro:  Bianca Armentano 
Vittorio Caprioli Pino Calamai
Franca Valeri: Marisa  
Adriana Asti: la ragazza di Felice
Giorgio Ardisson: Romano
Marcello Paolini:  Nicola Armentano
Enrico Olivieri:  Salvatore Armentano
Achille Majeroni: il nonno istriano
Giusi Raspani Dandolo: la madre istriana
Luigi De Filippo: Neri  
Giuliano Gemma: un pugile al peso

References

External links

1959 films
Commedia all'italiana
Films directed by Mauro Bolognini
Films scored by Carlo Rustichelli
Italian comedy films
Films set in Rome
1950s Italian-language films
1950s Italian films